La Ferté-Bernard is a commune in the Sarthe department in the Pays de la Loire region in north-western France.

History
La Ferté-Bernard owes its origin and name to a stronghold (fermeté) built about the 11th century and afterwards held by the family of Bernard. In 1424 it did not succumb to the English troops until after a four months' siege. It belonged in the 16th century to the family of Guise and supported the League, but was captured by the royal forces in 1590.

La Ferté-Bernard was involved in the 1906 Grand Prix de l'Automobile Club de France, the world's first motoring Grand Prix. The D97 towards Le Mans and the D1 towards Vibraye and Saint-Calais formed two sides of the triangular course.

Population

Notable people
Louise du Pierry, astronomer, was born here on 7/30/1746 or 8/1/1746 as Elisabeth Louise Felicite Pourra de la Madeleine.

Local folklore
La Ferte-Bernard is connected with a mythical dragon called the Peluda, which is said to have terrorized the town in medieval times.

Twin towns
It is twinned with Louth in Lincolnshire.

See also
Communes of the Sarthe department

References

Communes of Sarthe
Maine (province)